The women's 52 kilograms (Half lightweight) competition at the 2002 Asian Games in Busan was held on 2 October at the Gudeok Gymnasium.

Schedule
All times are Korea Standard Time (UTC+09:00)

Results

Main bracket

Repechage

References
2002 Asian Games Report, Page 465

External links
 
 Official website

W52
Judo at the Asian Games Women's Half Lightweight
Asian W52